The Better Half is a 2017 Philippine drama television series starring Shaina Magdayao, Carlo Aquino, JC de Vera and Denise Laurel. The series aired on ABS-CBN's Kapamilya Gold afternoon block and worldwide on The Filipino Channel from February 13, 2017 to September 8, 2017, replacing the 1-year run of Doble Kara, and was replaced by The Promise of Forever.

Synopsis
Camille (Shaina Magdayao) is happily married to Marco (Carlo Aquino). Meanwhile, Bianca (Denise Laurel), Marco's childhood friend, is secretly in love with him. She begs Marco to marry her but Marco's heart is only for Camille.

After Marco's and Camille's wedding, Marco flies to Dubai as an overseas worker. Unfortunately, the plane crashes with no survivors. Bianca, obsessed with Marco, does not stop searching for him and finds him stranded in an island. Marco suffers amnesia but remembers Bianca from his childhood. Bianca decides to use his amnesia and builds an intricate lie to him about his life: she tells him she is his wife and they live together as man and wife. Meanwhile, Camille is distraught over her husband's death and eventually meets Rafael (JC de Vera), they fall in love and get married. Camille runs a school and the couple try to have a baby.

Months after, Bianca's greatest fear comes true as Marco begins to slowly recover his memories of another woman, but is unable to put figure it out. Bianca uses information she gathers about Camille and manipulates Marco into believing his recovering memories are of her. However, Marco continues to pursue his unanswered questions about his memories.

Bianca discovers she is pregnant and ultimately, Marco chooses to go with Bianca to the United States. They soon get married, and Bianca gives birth to a baby girl they name Julia. They are a happy family and soon set up a furniture business.  But Bianca's father suffers a heart attack and Bianca is required to return home to run her father's failing business, so Bianca and Marco return to Manila with their dad alighted Julia, who is enrolled in the school run by Camille.  Bianca discovers that her father signed a partnership agreement with Rafael's company.

Marco and Camille's world collide, but Marco does not recognize Camille. When his memory returns, Camille petitions for an annulment of their first marriage.  Camille loves Rafael and has moved on from Marco. Bianca's obsession and paranoia gets worse and life becomes dangerous for Camille, Rafael and her loved ones. In Bianca's psychotic state, she kills most of Camille's loved ones, including Rafael, and Camille almost perishes but is saved by Marco.

Cast and characters

Main cast
 Shaina Magdayao as Camille Villalobos Saison/Camille Villalobos Cabrera- A sweet, loving, kindhearted wife, but tough fighter person. The main protagonist.  First wife of Marco, but she thought he died in a plane crash.  Years later, she moved on, met and fell in love with Rafael Cabrera, the love of her life.  They married, and it was only years later that they learned that Marco was still alive, with a family of his own.  This complicated their marriage status, so Camille filed for an annulment.
 Carlo Aquino as Marco Saison- The former husband of Camille and object of obsession by Bianca.  He was rescued from a plane crash by Bianca and kept in an island, as Bianca fabricated a story that they were in love.  She told him he suffered from amnesia after a car accident,  Marco grew up with Bianca and was her protector.  After his accident, his memory of Camille was wiped out, and he only remembered Bianca.  It was easy for him to believe Bianca's lies that they had a deep girlfriend/boyfriend relationship.
 JC de Vera as Rafael Cabrera- The loving husband of Camille. He rescued Camille from a deep depression after she thought Marco died.  He is the scion of Luis Cabrera Group of Companies, one of the country's top property development firm.  He marries Camille and they are very happy together.  However, when Marco emerged, the uncertainty of the legal status of their marriage caused a big rift in their relationship, particularly with Rafael's mother, who initially pushed for an annulment of Rafael and Camille's marriage.  Despite the many obstacles they faced, Camille and Rafael's love triumphed.  Unfortunately he is killed by Bianca. 
 Denise Laurel as Bianca Buenaflor Saison- She is the main female antagonist of the series. She will do anything for Marco. She had a tragic past when she was repeatedly raped by her uncle and her stepmother did not stop it. She suffered many mental disorders like Bipolar disorder, Schizophrenia, and others. She killed her stepmother and planned to kill any protagonist of the series, she killed the antagonistic Mayora played by Carmi Martin because she knew that Bianca brainwashed Marco. In the end, she was killed, but not before killing the main protagonist of the series (Rafael) and others.

Supporting cast
 Nadia Montenegro as Susan Villalobos - Camille's loving mother.
 Maila Gumila as Clarita Alejo-Buenaflor - Revealed to be antagonist who witnessed her brother raping Bianca however she did not do anything but later she is killed by Bianca, by shooting her at the cemetery.
 Joyce Ann Burton as Helen Leviste-Cabrera- Rafael's overprotective mother and antagonistic toward Camille.
 Rommel Padilla as Edgar Villalobos- Camille's loving father.
 Bart Guingona as Alfredo Buenaflor - The secondary antagonist of the series. Bianca's father who dislike Marco in his daughter's life. So he planned to kill him instead, he is the one who helped Bianca in her evil plans against her enemies. He is accidentally killed by Rafael due to his escape to the police.
 Mari Kaimo as Luisito Cabrera - Rafael's father.
 Carmi Martin as Mayor Dyna "Mayora" Soriano - One of the two main antagonist of the series until up to her death the other one is Bianca Buenaflor. She is one of the arch-enemies of the main villain (Bianca). She is the evil mayor of the city. And the one who killed Rafael's sister. She knows everything Bianca did to Marco, like how she brainwashed Marco and killed Sheryl Canlas. She is killed by Bianca by poisoning her.
 Cisum Ian Realeza as Julia Bianca Saison - Bianca and Marco's daughter, sometimes antagonist toward Camille but they became friends. She died because she fell in the stairs when she knew about her mother's crime.
 Epy Quizon as Juancho Alejo- Antagonist; Bianca's uncle who raped her everynight. But Bianca killed him and buried him in the forest.
 Regine Angeles as Sheryl Canlas- Camille's traitor friend who regrets all of her sins to Camille. When she is about to tell Camille about the truth, Bianca sent one of her loyal henchmen to steal the files but accidentally stabs Sheryl. Sheryl haunts Bianca and always torments her about what she did.
 Zeppi Borromeo as Julio Villalobos
 Sharmaine Suarez as Romina de los Reyes
 Pooh as Ferdie Mauricio
 Gerald Madrid as Jonas Canlas
 Emmanuelle Vera as Ashley Fuentes
 Junjun Quintana as Aris Jacob

Guest cast
 Delphine Buencamino as Karen Cortes
 Guji Lorenzana as Dindo Domingo
 Johan Santos as Louie
 Marina Benipayo as Mrs. Lee
 Gilleth Sandico as Dra. Punzalan
 Arthur Acuña as Judge Frank Orosa
 Scott Tibayan as General Herras
 JM Reyes as Julio Rafael "JR" Villalobos Cabrera

Special participation
 Katrina Legaspi as Veronica Cabrera
 Ahron Villena as Michael Vigamora
 Ashley Samiento as young Camille
 Allyson McBride as young Bianca
 Lance Lucido as young Marco
 John Manalo as teen Marco
 Nonie Buencamino as Marco's biological father
 Ivan Ortega as Rafael Cabrera's gay lover

Reception

Production

Premiere
The Better Half was not really planned to premiere on February 13, 2017. However, in a last minute change, the management decided to air the series immediately and released a full trailer on February 8, 2017, five days before the pilot episode. This became the official successor of Doble Kara instead of Wildflower. While the management decided to put Wildflower on Primetime Bida timeslot.

Timeslot change
After The Greatest Love ended, the management decided to move The Better Half to 4:15 PM giving way for Pusong Ligaw to take the 3:30 PM timeslot.

Currently streaming on Kapamilya Online Live Primetime Bida every weeknights, 10:15 pm. 

Also aired on PIE Channel from Mondays to Fridays, 12:45 pm with a marathon every Sunday, 12:00 nn to 3:00 pm.

See also
 List of programs broadcast by ABS-CBN
 List of drama series of ABS-CBN

References

ABS-CBN drama series
Psychological thriller television series
Philippine crime television series
Philippine melodrama television series
Philippine romance television series
Philippine thriller television series
2017 Philippine television series debuts
2017 Philippine television series endings
Filipino-language television shows
Television shows filmed in the Philippines